Paul McGinn (born 22 October 1990) is a Scottish footballer, who plays as a defender for Scottish Premiership club Motherwell and the Scottish national team.  He has previously played for Queen's Park, Dumbarton, Dundee, Chesterfield, Partick Thistle, St Mirren and Hibernian.

Career

Queen's Park
Raised in Clydebank, McGinn started his career as a youth player at Queen's Park. He made his debut on 2 May 2009, in Queen's Park's 1–0 defeat to Raith Rovers. Having come on as a substitute, he was sent off in the 90th minute.

St Mirren
On 18 September 2012, McGinn signed for Scottish Premier League side St Mirren until the end of the season, despite interest from Aberdeen and Dundee United. On 24 November 2012, he went out on loan to former his club Queen's Park. The loan was necessary to give him game time, as he was registered as an amateur and unable to play in the SPL until January. He then finished the season on loan to Dumbarton. Despite being offered a new contract, McGinn opted to leave St Mirren at the end of the season.

Dumbarton
After his successful loan spell, on 4 June 2013, McGinn agreed a one-year deal with Dumbarton. In all he made 42 appearances in all competitions that season as the side finished fifth in the Scottish Championship. McGinn was also named as part of the 2013–14 PFA Scotland Scottish Championship Team of the Year.

Dundee
On 20 June 2014, McGinn was persuaded by Dundee manager Paul Hartley to sign a two-year contract alongside former St Mirren teammate Paul McGowan. He made his debut on 2 August 2014, as Dundee beat Peterhead 4–0 in the Scottish League Cup.

Chesterfield
On 22 June 2016, McGinn signed a two-year contract with English club Chesterfield after his Dundee contract expired. He scored his first goal for Chesterfield in a 3–1 EFL Cup loss against Rochdale on 9 August 2016. On 25 August 2017 he left the club, with his contract being cancelled by mutual consent.

Partick Thistle
McGinn returned to Scottish football on 31 August 2017, signing a one-year contract with Partick Thistle. Thistle were relegated from the Scottish Premiership, via the playoffs, in his only season with the club.

St Mirren (second spell)
McGinn returned to St Mirren in May 2018, signing a two-year contract. He agreed a deal with the club while the manager position was vacant; Alan Stubbs took over in June 2018.

Hibernian
McGinn signed an 18-month contract with Hibernian on 31 January 2020, moving from St Mirren for an undisclosed transfer fee. He was added to the Scotland international squad in October 2020, after six players dropped out of the initial selection due to injuries and COVID-19. On the same day as his international selection, McGinn agreed an extended contract with Hibernian. McGinn scored his first goals for Hibs, and his first since April 2019, when he scored twice in a 2–2 draw with St Johnstone on 24 November. 

On 18 September 2021, McGinn scored against his former club St Mirren during a 2–2 draw. His appearances for Hibs during the 2021–22 season triggered a one-year extension to his contract, but he was allowed to leave by mutual consent soon afterwards.

Motherwell
After leaving Hibs, McGinn signed a one-year contract with Motherwell.

International career

In October 2020, McGinn received his first national team call-up from Scotland, but he failed to make an appearance.

On 6 September 2021, McGinn was called up for Scotland for a second time following three players’ withdrawal from the squad. On 7 September, McGinn came off the bench to make his international debut against Austria in Vienna, where Scotland won 1–0. His brother John was already on the field, and they became only the third siblings to play together for the national team since the end of World War II. It was also the first occasion that he and Scotland captain Andy Robertson had played together since their time in the fourth tier of Scottish football with Queen's Park eight years earlier.

Personal life
Paul's older brother Stephen and younger brother John are also footballers. Stephen plays for Falkirk while John plays for Aston Villa. All three brothers have played for St Mirren and Hibernian during their careers. Their grandfather Jack McGinn is a former Celtic chairman and Scottish Football Association president.

Career statistics

Notes

References

1990 births
Living people
Footballers from Glasgow
Sportspeople from Clydebank
Footballers from West Dunbartonshire
Scottish footballers
Association football defenders
Queen's Park F.C. players
St Mirren F.C. players
Dumbarton F.C. players
Dundee F.C. players
Chesterfield F.C. players
Scottish Football League players
Scottish Professional Football League players
English Football League players
Partick Thistle F.C. players
Hibernian F.C. players
Scotland international footballers
Motherwell F.C. players